Schenefeld is a municipality in the district of Steinburg, in Schleswig-Holstein, Germany. It is situated approximately 14 km north of Itzehoe.

Schenefeld is the seat of the Amt ("collective municipality") Schenefeld.

The population was roughly 2,447 people as of 2008.

References

Steinburg